Cecil Rawle (27 March 1891 – 9 June 1938) was a Dominican barrister, activist and father of Pan-Caribbeanism, who is honoured as Dominica's first national hero.

Biography
Rawle was born in Roseau, Dominica, where his Trinidadian parents, William Alexander Romilly Rawle and Elsie Elizabeth Sophia Garrett, had moved; his father was head of the local branch of the West India and Panama Telegraph Company, the precursor of Cable and Wireless. Rawle attended Dominica Grammar School and Codrington College in Barbados. He subsequently moved to London, where he went on to graduate as a barrister at the Inner Temple in 1913.

He practised law in Grenada and Trinidad, before he returned to Dominica and went on to found the Dominica Representative Government Association. In 1924 a new constitution was granted and Rawle was elected to represent Roseau in the elections the following year. He was an avid campaigner and activist in the political arena in Dominica. In addition to practising law, Rawle owned the Dominica Tribune Newspaper, which in 1924 he incorporated with the Dominica Guardian.

In 1932 he chaired the Dominica Conference, which became known as The West Indies Conference, at which there were representatives from Trinidad, Barbados, Dominica, Montserrat, St. Lucia, St. Vincent, Antigua, St. Kitts and Grenada. The first regional meeting to be initiated by Caribbean leaders to discuss the future of the region, it led the way for the West Indies Federation. In his final address, Rawle stated: "We suggest that there should be a Governor General of the whole of the West Indies who in the exercise of the powers and authorities entrusted to him must act upon the advice of the Federal Executive Council....the Federal Assembly will from its own membership select for the Governor his advisers. The most radical change of all perhaps, is the proposal that the Governor General and in similar manner the Officers administering the Island Governments shall not have the power to disregard the advice of their Executive Councils. In Canada, Newfoundland, New Zealand, and even little Malta, the officers administering the Government act upon the advice of their Executive Councils. Why should the peoples of the West Indies continue to be burdened with executives irresponsible to the Legislature?"

In 1937, Rawle was appointed Attorney General of the Leeward Islands and moved to Antigua, where he died suddenly the following year, at the age of 47.

References

External links
 Cecil Rawle on itzcaribbean
 Cecil Rawle - Dominica Heritage
 Gabriel J. Christian, "Honorable Cecil Edgar Allan Rawle". Dominica Academy of Arts and Sciences.
 The Dominica Guardian issues from 1893 to 1924 available freely and fully as Open Access in the Digital Library of the Caribbean

1891 births
1937 deaths
Dominica politicians
Dominica people of Trinidad and Tobago descent
Attorneys General of the Leeward Islands
Dominica lawyers
20th-century lawyers
People from Roseau